Gate of Grief is the debut studio album by American band White Ring. It was released in July 2018 under Rocket Girl Records.

Track listing

Notes
 "Do U Love Me 2?" samples "Je t'aime Till My Dying Day" by Enigma, from their 2008 album Seven Lives Many Faces.

References

2018 debut albums